Jagarnathpur (Nepali: जगरनाथपुर ) is a rural municipality in Parsa District in Province No. 2 of Nepal. It was formed in 2016 occupying current 6 sections (wards) from previous 6 former VDCs. It occupies an area of 45.29 km2 with a total population of 31,591.

References 

Rural municipalities of Nepal established in 2017
Populated places in Parsa District
Rural municipalities in Madhesh Province